Rocket Gibraltar is a 1988 American drama film directed by Daniel Petrie and starring Burt Lancaster, Suzy Amis, Patricia Clarkson, Frances Conroy, Sinead Cusack, John Glover, Bill Pullman, Kevin Spacey and Macaulay Culkin in his film debut.

Plot 

Levi Rockwell is a retired, widowed Hollywood screenwriter and patriarch who reunites his entire family at his Long Island estate for his 77th birthday, but personal and social problems abound. His four children, son Rolo, and daughters Ruby, Rose and Aggie arrive, along with their spouses and children, to help him celebrate his 77th birthday. During the course of the family reunion, Levi's health begins to fail and he voices a sentimental request that he be given a "Viking Funeral" after his death. With his adult children consumed by their own personal worries, the grandchildren honor Levi's last wishes.

Cast 

 Burt Lancaster as Levi Rockwell
 Suzy Amis as Aggie Rockwell
 Patricia Clarkson as Rose Black
 Macaulay Culkin as Cy Blue Black
 Angela Goethals as Dawn Black
 Frances Conroy as Ruby Hanson
 John Glover as Rolo Rockwell
 Sinéad Cusack as Amanda "Billi" Rockwell
 Sara Rue as Jessica Hanson
 Bill Pullman as Crow Black
 Kevin Spacey as Dwayne Hanson
 David Hyde Pierce as Monsieur Henri

References

External links

1988 films
1988 drama films
American drama films
Columbia Pictures films
Films about dysfunctional families
Films about old age
Films directed by Daniel Petrie
Films set in Long Island
Films shot in New York (state)
1980s English-language films
1980s American films